Montclair State University, signed as Montclair State University Station at Little Falls, is a NJ Transit rail station on Clove Road near U.S. Route 46 ant the Montclair State University campus in the Great Notch area of Little Falls, New Jersey on the Montclair-Boonton Line. The station opened in 2004.

History 
The station opened on October 20, 2004, and was built for $26 million, following the completion of the Montclair Connection. Although the station itself was not officially open, a temporary platform was built to allow the under-construction station to serve one of its main purposes as the Montclair-Boonton Line's primary transfer station.

Station layout and service

The station has two tracks and one sheltered, high-level island platform with an elevated walkway over the tracks connecting it to the parking deck and the college campus. The station is equipped with ticket machines and DepartureVision monitors displaying arrivals and departures. It is accessible as the platform is fully elevated and elevators are available in addition to stairs. The station was intended to be a park-and-ride, near a highway and with a large parking deck.

There is no connecting bus service directly to the station, as the university's bus stop is on the opposite side of campus near the Montclair Heights station. Campus shuttles, however, do serve the station.

On weekdays, every train on the Montclair-Boonton Line stops here. Midtown Direct service to New York Penn Station terminates here, as the line west of the nearby yard is not electrified. The station is a major transfer point for riders because many trains terminate here, it is the first station on the line with service to New York Penn Station, and it is the first local stop of express trains.

Montclair State University is not served on weekends, with weekend service on the line terminating at Bay Street.

References

External links

NJ Transit Rail Operations stations
Montclair, New Jersey
Railway stations in the United States opened in 2004
Railway stations in Essex County, New Jersey
Railway stations in New Jersey at university and college campuses
2004 establishments in New Jersey